The 2022 Philadelphia Stars season was the first season for the Philadelphia Stars as a professional American football franchise. They played as charter members of the United States Football League, one of eight teams to compete in the league for the 2022 season. The Stars technically played as a traveling team (since the entirety of the regular season will be played at Protective Stadium and Legion Field in Birmingham, Alabama) and were led by head coach Bart Andrus.

Personnel

Final roster

The Stars, like all other teams, have a 38-man active roster with a 7-man practice squad.

Staff

Schedule
The Stars' 2022 schedule was announced on March 7. They opened the season against the New Orleans Breakers.

Note: Intra-division opponents are in bold text. 

All games held at Protective Stadium, with the exceptions of the Week 8 and Week 10 games (Both held at Legion Field)

Game summaries

Week 1: at New Orleans Breakers

The Stars started their season against the New Orleans Breakers. They had a chance to go up 3-0 on their first drive, but Matt Mengal missed a 45 yard field goal. On their second drive, a Bryan Scott pass was intercepted by Vontae Diggs and returned for a touchdown, putting the Stars down 0-7.  In the second quarter, the Breakers blocked a punt in the endzone for a safety, putting the Stars down 0-9. In the waning minutes of the second quarter, the Stars drove 94 yards downfield, aided by 20 penalty yards, and scored, putting them at a 7-9 deficit. In the third quarter, a Breakers pass was intercepted by Channing Stribling, which set the Stars up at the Breakers 20 yard line. However, they could not capitalize, losing a yard and settling for a 38 yard field goal to take the lead 10-9. Halfway into the third, the Breakers took the lead again with a 58 yard touchdown drive and a 2 point conversion, putting the Stars down 10-17. The Stars responded in the fourth with a 2 play 50 yard drive which included a Darnell Holland 42 yard rush, to tie it up 17-17. The Breakers responded on their next drive with a 9 play 63 yard drive, putting the Stars down 17-23, which would be the final score as both teams traded possessions for the rest of the fourth.

Week 2: vs. Pittsburgh Maulers

The Stars played against division rival Pittsburgh Maulers. In their first two drives, they committed two turnovers; a Bryan Scott interception and a Darnell Holland fumble. The Maulers struck first on a 25 yard field goal on the back of a fumble by the Stars to put the Stars down 0-3. The Stars responded by driving 75 yards for a touchdown to put the Stars up 7-3. On the first play of the ensuing drive, Maulers quarterback Josh Love threw an interception to Ahmad Dixon, putting the Stars at the Maulers 21. The Stars capitalized, driving for another touchdown, putting them up 14-3. During their next drive, Maulers cornerback Jaylon McClain-Sapp strip-sacked Scott, returning it 80 yards for the touchdown, putting the Stars at 14-10. The Maulers scored another touchdown on their next drive, putting the Stars down 14-16. The Stars responded with a touchdown drive capped off by a 20-yard pass, putting the Stars up 21-16.

In the second half, the only points came off a Maulers touchdown to put the Stars down 21-23. The fourth quarter saw the Stars drive 61 yards for a touchdown, and convert the first 3-point attempt in the USFL to put the Stars up 30-23, which would be the final score.

Week 3: vs. New Jersey Generals

The Stars took on division rival New Jersey Generals in a game in which the winner would gain 1st in the North Division. With 11:23 left in the 1st quarter, Stars quarterback Bryan Scott completed a 41-yard touchdown pass to tight end Bug Howard. On the final drive of the first quarter. In the 2nd quarter, the Stars drove into the red zone, but only came away with 3 points on a Matt Mengel 22-yard field goal, extending their lead to 10-0. The Generals would drive the game to a 1 possession game before half, connecting on a 54-yard field goal by kicker Nick Rose. The Stars would lead 10-3 at halftime.

On the first drive of the second half, the Generals would tie the game at 10 on a 4-yard Darius Victor rushing touchdown. But on the next drive, the Stars would take the lead on a 6-yard pass from quarterback Case Cookus to wide receiver Diondre Overton. The 4th quarter would be all New Jersey, as they would get 14 unanswered points. A 1-yard Darius Victor run, and a 4-yard De'Andre Johnson run. The loss put the Stars at 2nd in the North Division.

Standings

Postseason

References

Philadelphia
2022 in sports in Pennsylvania
Philadelphia Stars (2022)